John B. Forester (died August 1, 1845) was an American politician that represented Tennessee's fifth district in the United States House of Representatives.

Biography
Forester was born in McMinnville, Tennessee. Although he received a limited schooling, he studied law. He was admitted to the bar, and practiced law, as one of the early lawyers of Warren County, Tennessee.

Career
Forester was elected as a Jacksonian to the Twenty-third Congress and re-elected as an Anti-Jacksonian candidate to the Twenty-fourth Congress. He served from March 4, 1833 to March 3, 1837.

Death
Forester died on August 1, 1845. The place he was interred is unknown.

References

External links

Year of birth missing
1845 deaths
People from McMinnville, Tennessee
Jacksonian members of the United States House of Representatives from Tennessee
National Republican Party members of the United States House of Representatives from Tennessee